The North Dakota Department of Agriculture is a part of the government of the U.S. state of North Dakota. The department fosters a healthy economic, environmental, and social climate for agriculture and the rural community through leadership, advocacy, education, regulation and other services.

History
The department was established in 1966 when the North Dakota Department of Agriculture and Labor split into two separate entities, with the other being the North Dakota Department of Labor.

See also
North Dakota Agriculture Commissioner

External links
North Dakota Department of Agriculture website

State agencies of North Dakota
State departments of agriculture of the United States
1966 establishments in North Dakota